, stylized as SANYO, is a Japanese electronics company and formerly a member of the Fortune Global 500 whose headquarters was located in Moriguchi, Osaka prefecture, Japan. Sanyo had over 230 subsidiaries and affiliates, and was founded by Toshio Iue in 1947.

On December 21, 2009, Panasonic completed a 400 billion yen ($4.5 billion) acquisition of a 50.2% stake in Sanyo, making Sanyo a subsidiary of Panasonic. In April 2011, Sanyo became a wholly owned subsidiary of Panasonic, with its assets integrated into the latter's portfolio.

History

Beginnings

Sanyo was founded when Toshio Iue the brother-in-law of Konosuke Matsushita and also a former Matsushita employee, was lent an unused Matsushita plant in 1947 and used it to make bicycle generator lamps. Sanyo was incorporated in 1949; in 1952 it made Japan's first plastic radio and in 1954 Japan's first pulsator-type washing machine.  The company's name means three oceans in Japanese, referring to the founder's ambition to sell their products worldwide, across the Atlantic, Pacific, and Indian oceans.

Sanyo in America
In 1969 Howard Ladd became the Executive Vice President and COO of Sanyo Corporation. Ladd introduced the Sanyo brand to the United States in 1970. The ambition to sell Sanyo products worldwide was realized in the mid 1970s after Sanyo introduced home audio equipment, car stereos and other consumer electronics to the North American market. The company embarked on a heavy television-based advertising campaign.

Ladd negotiated a purchase of the Fisher Electronics audio equipment manufacturer by Sanyo in May 1975. Under Ladd’s leadership, the Fisher Corporation under Sanyo grew to be a multi-million dollar leader in the consumer electronics industry. The new, profitable Fisher Corporation moved its headquarters from New York to Ladd's Los Angeles. Ladd was named President and CEO of the combined Sanyo / Fisher Corporation in 1977, serving until 1987.

Ladd was instrumental at Sanyo in promoting Quadraphonic sound audio equipment for the American market, producing 4-channel audio equipment in both SQ and Matrix formats. He said "we make all kinds of quadrasonic equipment because this is the business we're in... let the consumer buy the kind of software he prefers and we'll provide him the hardware to play it on".

Sanyo realized tremendous growth during Ladd's tenure in the 1970s; annual sales grew from $71.4 million in 1972 to $855 million in 1978.

After a fairly slow selling line in their own V-Cord video format, Sanyo adopted Sony's Betamax video cassette format around 1977 with initial success, including SuperBeta and Beta Hi-Fi models.  From around 1984 onwards production switched entirely to VHS.

In 1976 Sanyo expanded their North American presence with the purchase of Whirlpool Corporation's television business, Warwick Electronics, which manufactured televisions for Sears.

In 1986, Sanyo's U.S. affiliate merged with Fisher to become Sanyo Fisher (U.S.A.) Corporation (later renamed Sanyo Fisher Company). The mergers made the entire organization more efficient, but also resulted in the departure of certain key executives, including Ladd, who had first introduced the Sanyo name to the United States in the early 1970s.

In 1982, Sanyo started selling the MBC-1000 series of CP/M computers. In 1983  it introduced the MBC-550 PC, the lowest-cost IBM PC compatible personal computer available at the time, but its lack of full compatibility drove Sanyo from the market and no follow-on models were released.

1990s corporate culture
An article on "Sanyo Style" written in 1992 described that Sanyo utilizes an extensive socialization process for new employees, so that they will be acclimatized to Sanyo's corporate culture. New employees take a five-month course during which they eat together and sleep together in accommodation. They learn everything from basic job requirements to company expectations for personal grooming and the appropriate way in which to dress for their co-workers and superiors.

Technologically Sanyo has had good ties with Sony, supporting the Betamax video format from invention until the mid-1980s (the best selling video recorder in the UK in 1983 was the Sanyo VTC5000), while producing the VHS video format at the same time for the Fisher brand during the early 1980s, and later being an early adopter of the highly successful Video8 camcorder format. More recently, though, Sanyo decided against supporting Sony's format, the Blu-ray Disc, and instead gave its backing to Toshiba's HD DVD. This was ultimately unsuccessful, however, as Sony's Blu-ray triumphed.

In North America, Sanyo manufactured CDMA cellular phones exclusively for Sprint's Sprint PCS brand in the United States, and for Bell Mobility in Canada.

Acquisition
The 2004 Chūetsu earthquake severely damaged Sanyo's semiconductor plant and as a result Sanyo recorded a huge financial loss for that year. The 2005 fiscal year financial results saw a 205 billion yen net income loss. The same year the company announced a restructuring plan called the Sanyo Evolution Project, launching a new corporate vision to make the corporation into an environmental company, plowing investment into strong products like rechargeable batteries, solar photovoltaics, air conditioning, hybrid car batteries and key consumer electronics such as the Xacti camera, projectors and mobile phones.

Sanyo posted signs of recovery after the announcement of positive operating income of 2.6 billion yen. Sanyo remains the world number one producer of rechargeable batteries. Recent product innovations in this area include the Eneloop Low self-discharge NiMH battery, a "hybrid" rechargeable NiMH (Nickel-metal hydride battery) which, unlike typical NiMH cells, can be used from-the-package without an initial recharge cycle and retain a charge significantly longer than batteries using standard NiMH battery design. The Eneloop line competes against similar products such as Rayovac's "Hybrid Rechargeable" line.

On November 24, 2006, Sanyo announced heavy losses and job cuts.

Tomoyo Nonaka, a former NHK anchorwoman who was appointed chairwoman of the company, stepped down in March 2007. The President, Toshimasa Iue,  also stepped down in April of that year; Seiichiro Sano was appointed to head the company effective April 2007.
In October 2007, Sanyo cancelled a 110 billion yen sale of its semiconductor business, blaming the global credit crisis for the decision and stating that after exploring its other options, it had decided to keep the business and develop it as part of its portfolio.

In 2008, Sanyo's mobile phone division was acquired by Kyocera.

On November 2, 2008, Sanyo and Panasonic announced that they have agreed on the main points of a proposed buyout that would make Sanyo a subsidiary of Panasonic. They became a subsidiary of Panasonic on December 21, 2009.

In 2010, Sanyo sold its semiconductor operations to ON Semiconductor.

On July 29, 2010, Panasonic reached an agreement to acquire the remaining shares of Panasonic Electric Works and Sanyo shares for $9.4 billion.

By March 2012, parent company Panasonic plans to terminate the Sanyo brand, however it will remain on some of the products where the Sanyo brand still holds value to consumers. In the same month, Sanyo's Southeast Asian unit, responsible for the manufacturing of consumer electric appliances in the region, was announced to be formally acquired by Haier.

In August 2013, a 51% majority stake in Chinese company Hefei Royalstar Sanyo, a 2000 joint venture between Japanese Sanyo and Chinese government investment company Hefei, was purchased by American multinational manufacturer Whirlpool Corporation for $552 million.

Energy

Solar cells and plants

The Sanyo HIT (Heterojunction with Intrinsic Thin layer) solar cell is composed of a mono thin crystalline silicon wafer surrounded by ultra-thin amorphous silicon layers.

Sanyo Energy opened its solar module assembly plants in Hungary and in Mexico in 2004, and in 2006 it produced solar modules worth $213 million.  In 2007, Sanyo completed a new unit at its solar module plant in Hungary that was to triple its annual capacity to 720,000 units in 2008.

Plans to expand production were based on rising demands for Sanyo Hungary products, whose leading markets are Germany, Italy, Spain and Scandinavia.  The plant at Dorog, outside Budapest, became Sanyo's largest solar module production facility in the world. Germany, Italy, Spain and the Scandinavian countries.  The plant at Dorog, outside Budapest, will be Sanyo Electric's largest facility producing solar modules in the entire world.

In late September 2008, Sanyo announced its decision to build a manufacturing plant for solar ingots and wafers (the building blocks for silicon solar cells) in Inagi, Japan. The plant began operating in October 2009 and was to reach its full production capacity of 70 megawatts (MW) of solar wafers per year by April 2010. Sanyo and Nippon Oil decided to launch a joint company, known as Sanyo Eneos Solar Co., Ltd., for the production and sale of thin-film solar panels. The new joint company began production and sales at an initial scale of 80 MW, while gradually increasing its production capacity. For this joint project, Sanyo drew on its solar cell technologies, based on the technology acquired through the development of the HIT solar cell.

Sanyo is also responsible for the construction of the Solar Ark.

Rechargeable batteries
Sanyo pioneered the production of nickel cadmium batteries in 1964, nickel metal hydride batteries (NiMh) in 1990, lithium-ion batteries in 1994, and lithium polymer batteries in 1999. In 2000, it acquired Toshiba's NiMh business, including the Takasaki factory. Since the acquisition of Sanyo by Panasonic, ownership of the Takasaki factory was transferred to the FDK Corporation.

Electric vehicle batteries
Sanyo supplies NiMh batteries to Honda, Ford, Volkswagen and PSA Peugeot Citroen. Sanyo is developing NiMH batteries for hybrid electric vehicles with the Volkswagen group, while their lithium-ion batteries for plug-in HEV will also be housed in Suzuki fleet vehicles.

Sanyo planned to raise monthly production of NiMH batteries for hybrid vehicles from 1 million units to up to 2.5 million by the end of fiscal 2005.

Sanyo India

Televisions
Panasonic reintroduced the Sanyo brand in India, with the launch of Sanyo LED TV range on August 8, 2016. On July 11, 2017, Sanyo launched its range of smart TVs on Amazon Prime Day. In August 2017, Sanyo unveiled its NXT range of LED televisions exclusively on Flipkart. In December 2017, Sanyo introduced its first 4K smart TV range in India.

In September 2019, Sanyo introduced a range of Android TV sets known as the Sanyo Kaizen Series.

Air conditioners
Sanyo worked with Energy Efficiency Services Limited to develop a 1.5-ton inverter air conditioner (AC) with an Indian Seasonal Energy Efficiency Ratio (ISEER) of 5.2. Distribution of these air conditioners began in September 2017.

On April 4, 2019, Sanyo launched a new AC range exclusively on Amazon.

Sanyo TV USA
Though founded in Japan, Sanyo has sold TVs in America for over 50 years; Sanyo TV USA was headquartered in San Diego, California with facilities located in Tijuana, Mexico.

Many of Sanyo's television sets offer MHL compatibility along with Roku-ready branding via HDMI, meaning the TVs are compatible with Roku's MHL-specific streaming stick. Sometimes included with purchase, such as with the Sanyo FVF5044, this stick enables video streaming and other online functions as an affordable alternative to certain smart TVs; the TV's original remote is capable of browsing the service. Multiple models also have USB ports which allow for immediate photo sharing directly off the stick without any additional software/upgrades.

Funai Era 
In October 2014, Panasonic announced its intent to transfer the Sanyo TV unit to Funai in the US market in return for annual royalty payments. Funai is a major Walmart supplier that also supplies Philips and Emerson TV sets to the retail chain. Consumer Reports commented in 2018 that Sanyo TVs "seem to turn up mostly in Walmart stores, almost as a private label for the retailer."

Record breaking achievements
Sanyo is also known for its thermal management sector, Sanyo Denki, which makes high speed, large airflow, high static pressure DC fans sold under the moniker "San Ace", a product line mainly geared towards the enterprise market. As of October 2020, Sanyo Denki holds the world record for both rotational speed and static pressure of various dimensions and models. Some notable records are:

Sponsorship
Sanyo was the primary sponsor of the Penrith Panthers in the National Rugby League in Australia from 2000 to 2012. In Formula One, the company backed Benetton from 1989 to 1995, Williams from 1995 to 1997 and Stewart Grand Prix from 1997 to 1999. In the football sponsored the Argentinian club River Plate from 1992 until 1995 and the brazilian Coritiba from 1995 until 1999.

References

External links

 Sanyo information on Panasonic website

Japanese companies established in 1949
2011 disestablishments in Japan
Audio equipment manufacturers of Japan
Battery manufacturers
Companies based in Osaka Prefecture
Companies formerly listed on the Tokyo Stock Exchange
Consumer battery manufacturers
Consumer electronics brands
Defunct semiconductor companies
Display technology companies
Electronics companies established in 1949
Electric vehicle battery manufacturers
Defunct defense companies of Japan
Defunct manufacturing companies of Japan
Heating, ventilation, and air conditioning companies
Japanese brands
Mobile phone manufacturers
Panasonic Corporation brands
Photography companies of Japan
Photovoltaics manufacturers
Portable audio player manufacturers
Solar energy companies
Solar energy companies of Japan
Thin-film cell manufacturers
Video equipment manufacturers
Defunct mobile phone manufacturers
2011 mergers and acquisitions
Semiconductor companies of Japan
Home appliance brands
Radio manufacturers
Electronics companies of Japan